United States Commodity Funds LLC (USCF) is a US company based in Oakland, CA, specializing in managing exchange-traded commodity funds, which are often referred to as commodity-based exchange-traded funds (ETFs). USCF was one of the earliest issuers of exchange-traded commodity funds in the United States. It is best known for launching in 2006 the first crude oil based exchange traded commodity fund in the United States, United States Oil Fund, LP (ticker: USO), as well as launching in 2007 the first natural gas exchange traded commodity fund, United States Natural Gas Fund, LP (ticker: UNG). USO and UNG are two of the most actively traded ETFs in the United States. , USCF managed eleven different exchange traded commodity funds with total assets of approximately $5 billion.

History
United States Commodity Funds LLC is an issuer of exchange traded commodity products (ETPs). It was founded in 2005 in Alameda, CA. The first fund it launched, in 2006, was United States Oil Fund, LP. USO was the first commodity ETF based on crude oil launched in the United States. USO was the fourth commodity ETP launched in the United States, after the SPDR Gold Shares Trust (ticker: GLD), the iShares COMEX Gold Trust (ticker: IAU), and the Powershares DB Commodity Index Fund (ticker: DBC). USO is the largest and most actively traded oil-based ETP in the United States.

In 2007, USCF launched United States Natural Gas Fund, LP, the first natural gas based ETP. UNG is the largest and most actively traded natural gas commodity ETP in the United States. USCF also launched the first gasoline based commodity ETP, United States Gasoline Fund, LP (ticker:UGA), and the first heating oil based commodity ETP, the United States Heating Oil Fund, LP, both in 2008. In 2010, USCF launched the first commodity ETP in the United States that invested in Brent crude oil (ticker:BNO), although previously a Brent crude oil based commodity ETP had been launched in London.

In 2010, USCF launched its first non-energy specific commodity ETP, United States Commodity Index Fund (ticker:USCI), which holds a diversified basket of commodity futures based on the SummerHaven Dynamic Commodity Index ("SDCI"). The SDCI is the first broadly diversified commodity index whose commodity weightings are not fixed, but which instead are adjusted to reflect market conditions.

USCF's commodity exchange traded products are all listed on the New York Stock Exchange. Prior to the merger of the American Stock Exchange with the New York Stock Exchange, all of USCF's products were listed for trading on the American Stock Exchange.

On October 6, 2010, commodity index provider SummerHaven Index Management announced that USCF had licensed two new indexes from SummerHaven.

Funds
The ETPs offered by USCF include eight single commodity funds, each based on an energy related commodity, and three commodity funds based on an indexes licensed by SummerHaven Index Management. The full listing of USCF funds is:
 United States Oil Fund, LP (ticker: USO)
 United States Natural Gas Fund, LP (ticker: UNG)
 United States 12 Month Oil Fund, LP (ticker: USL)
 United States Gasoline Fund, LP (ticker: UGA)
 United States Heating Oil Fund, LP (ticker: UHN)
 United States Short Oil Fund, LP (ticker: DNO)
 United States 12 Month Natural Gas Fund, LP (ticker: UNL)
 United States Brent Oil Fund, LP (ticker: BNO)
 United States Commodity Index Fund (ticker: USCI)
United States Copper Index Fund (ticker: CPER)
United States Agricultural Index Fund (ticker: USAG)

References

External links
 United States Commodity Funds

Exchange-traded funds
Companies based in Oakland, California